Hydrotaea floccosa is a species of house flies, etc. in the family Muscidae. It is found in Europe.

References

Muscidae
Muscomorph flies of Europe
Insects described in 1835
Taxa named by Pierre-Justin-Marie Macquart
Articles created by Qbugbot